General Foley may refer to:

John Foley (British Army officer) (born 1939), British Army lieutenant general
Robert F. Foley (born 1941), U.S. Army lieutenant general
St George Gerald Foley (1814–1897), British Army general

See also
Attorney General Foley (disambiguation)